I'll Always Be There is a 1993 English language album by Canadian singer Roch Voisine. It includes the hit single, "I'll Always Be There", and an English-language version of his earlier French language hit, "La légende d'Oochigeas", found on his Europe Tour live album.

Track listing
All songs by Roch Voisine except as noted.

I'll Always Be There (Voisine / David Foster)
Shout Out Loud 
Lost Without You (Voisine / Peter Barbeau)
Blue Bird 
She Picked On Me (Voisine / Marc Beaulieu)
Heaven or Hell 
For Adam's Sake 
Wind and Tears 
Stay (Voisine / James Campbell)
There's No Easy Way (Leo Kay)
Am I Wrong (Voisine / André Gagnon)
Oochigeas (Indian Song) - English version of La légende Oochigeas) (Voisine / Campbell)

External links
Roch Voisine Official site album page

1993 albums
Roch Voisine albums